Ahmet Ak (born 20 May 1966) is a Turkish wrestler. He competed in the men's freestyle 57 kg at the 1988 Summer Olympics.

References

External links
 

1966 births
Living people
Turkish male sport wrestlers
Olympic wrestlers of Turkey
Wrestlers at the 1988 Summer Olympics
Sportspeople from Kahramanmaraş
World Wrestling Championships medalists